Stojan Lukić (born 28 December 1979) is a Swedish footballer who play as a goalkeeper for Allsvenskan club Varbergs BoIS.

Career
Lukić grew up in Stockholm but relocated with his family to Halmstad at the age of 15. There he started out at local lower division side IF Leikin before eventually signing with another Halmstad based club, IS Halmia.

After shorter stints with Scania based clubs Högaborgs BK and Landskrona BoIS Lukić joined third tier Assyriska FF for the 2007 season. Even though he was the starting keeper and Assyriska won promotion Lukić decided to end his two-year contract prematurely as he was unable to settle in Södertälje.

He moved back home to Halmstad from where he was able to commute to nearby Falkenberg, home to second tier Superettan club Falkenbergs FF. There he impressed right away by having the second best save percentage in the league that season. After five years with Falkenberg he finally got the chance to play at the highest Swedish level Allsvenskan when he signed for Halmstads BK before the 2013 season started.

On 4 January 2019 it was announced, that Lukić would continue at Örgryte IS as an assistant manager under manager Thomas Askebrand. However, Lukić would still continue to be registered as a player. Lukić left Örgryte at the end of 2019 and joined Varbergs BoIS in February 2020 on a one-year deal.

Personal life
Lukić was born in Stockholm to Serb parents. His family moved to Halmstad when he was 15 years old.

References

External links

Fotbolltransfers profile

1979 births
Living people
Association football goalkeepers
Halmstads BK players
Falkenbergs FF players
Landskrona BoIS players
Assyriska FF players
Allsvenskan players
Superettan players
Swedish footballers
IS Halmia players
Örgryte IS players
Högaborgs BK players
Varbergs BoIS players
Swedish people of Serbian descent
Footballers from Stockholm